Eremophila arguta is a flowering plant in the figwort family, Scrophulariaceae and is endemic to a small area in the centre of Western Australia. It is a small, rarely seen shrub with long, arching branches and small, holly-like leaves, known from a few remote locations.

Description

The tube is lilac-coloured with yellowish-brown spots inside the tube and is hairy on the outside.

Taxonomy and naming
Eremophila arguta was first formally described by Robert Chinnock in 2007. The description was published in Eremophila and Allied Genera: A Monograph of the Plant Family Myoporaceae. The type specimen was collected on Mount Augustus Station. The specific epithet (arguta) is a Latin word meaning "sharp-toothed", referring to the edges of the leaves.

Distribution and habitat
This eremophila is only known from the Meekatharra, Upper Gascoyne and Wiluna local government areas in the Gascoyne and Murchison biogeographic regions. It grows on the edge of floodplains, in dry creek beds and on road verges.

Conservation status
Eremophila arguta is classified as "Priority One" by the Government of Western Australia Department of Parks and Wildlife, meaning that it is known from only one or a few locations which are potentially at risk.

Use in horticulture
This eremophila is a spectacular shrub which has been difficult to cultivate in gardens. It prefers well-drained soils and needs to be watered occasionally during hot periods but is frost-tolerant. It can be grown from cuttings or seed or by grafting onto Myoporum.

References

arguta
Eudicots of Western Australia
Plants described in 2007
Endemic flora of Western Australia
Taxa named by Robert Chinnock